The Lippmann–Schwinger equation (named after Bernard Lippmann and Julian Schwinger) is one of the most used equations to describe particle collisions – or, more precisely, scattering – in quantum mechanics. It may be used in scattering of molecules, atoms, neutrons, photons or any other particles and is important mainly in atomic, molecular, and optical physics, nuclear physics and particle physics, but also for seismic scattering problems in geophysics. It relates the scattered wave function with the interaction that produces the scattering (the scattering potential) and therefore allows calculation of the relevant experimental parameters (scattering amplitude and cross sections).

The most fundamental equation to describe any quantum phenomenon, including scattering, is the Schrödinger equation. In physical problems, this differential equation must be solved with the input of an additional set of initial and/or boundary conditions for the specific physical system studied. The Lippmann–Schwinger equation is equivalent to the Schrödinger equation plus the typical boundary conditions for scattering problems. In order to embed the boundary conditions, the Lippmann–Schwinger equation must be written as an integral equation. For scattering problems, the Lippmann–Schwinger equation is often more convenient than the original Schrödinger equation.

The Lippmann–Schwinger equation's general form is (in reality, two equations are shown below, one for the  sign and other for the  sign):

The potential energy  describes the interaction between the two colliding systems. The Hamiltonian  describes the situation in which the two systems are infinitely far apart and do not interact. Finally,  is a mathematical technicality necessary for the calculation of the integrals needed to solve the equation. It is a consequence of causality, ensuring that scattered waves consist only of outgoing waves. This is made rigorous by the limiting absorption principle.

Usage
The Lippmann–Schwinger equation is useful in a very large number of situations involving two-body scattering. For three or more colliding bodies it does not work well because of mathematical limitations; Faddeev equations may be used instead. However, there are approximations that can reduce a many-body problem to a set of two-body problems in a variety of cases. For example, in a collision between electrons and molecules, there may be tens or hundreds of particles involved. But the phenomenon may be reduced to a two-body problem by describing all the molecule constituent particle potentials together with a pseudopotential. In these cases, the Lippmann–Schwinger equations may be used. Of course, the main motivations of these approaches are also the possibility of doing the calculations with much lower computational efforts.

Derivation 

We will assume that the Hamiltonian may be written as

where  is the free Hamiltonian (or more generally, a Hamiltonian with known eigenvectors).  For example, in nonrelativistic quantum mechanics  may be

.

Intuitively  is the interaction energy of the system.  Let there be an eigenstate of :

.

Now if we add the interaction  into the mix, the Schrödinger equation reads

.

Now consider the Hellmann–Feynman theorem, which requires the energy eigenvalues of the Hamiltonian to change continuously with continuous changes in the Hamiltonian. A naive solution to this equation would be

.

As is described below, this singularity is eliminated in two distinct ways by making the denominator slightly complex, to give yourself a little wiggle room :

.

By insertion of a complete set of free particle states,

,

the Schrödinger equation is turned into an integral equation. The "in"  and "out"  states are assumed to form bases too, in the distant past and distant future respectively having the appearance of free particle states, but being eigenfunctions of the complete Hamiltonian. Thus endowing them with an index, the equation becomes

.

Methods of solution
From the mathematical point of view the Lippmann–Schwinger equation in coordinate representation is an integral equation of Fredholm type. It can be solved by discretization. Since it is equivalent to the differential time-independent Schrödinger equation with appropriate boundary conditions, it can also be solved by numerical methods for differential equations. In the case of the spherically symmetric potential  it is usually solved by partial wave analysis. For high energies and/or weak potential it can also be solved perturbatively by means of Born series. The method convenient also in the case of many-body physics, like in description of atomic, nuclear or molecular collisions is the method of R-matrix of Wigner and Eisenbud. Another class of methods is based on separable expansion of the potential or Green's operator like the method of continued fractions of Horáček and Sasakawa. Very important class of methods is based on variational principles, for example the Schwinger-Lanczos method combining the variational principle of Schwinger with Lanczos algorithm.

Interpretation as in and out states

The S-matrix paradigm

In the S-matrix formulation of particle physics, which was pioneered by John Archibald Wheeler among others, all physical processes are modeled according to the following paradigm.

One begins with a non-interacting multiparticle state in the distant past.  Non-interacting does not mean that all of the forces have been turned off, in which case for example protons would fall apart, but rather that there exists an interaction-free Hamiltonian H0, for which the bound states have the same energy level spectrum as the actual Hamiltonian .  This initial state is referred to as the in state.  Intuitively, it consists of elementary particles or bound states that are sufficiently well separated that their interactions with each other are ignored.

The idea is that whatever physical process one is trying to study may be modeled as a scattering process of these well separated bound states.  This process is described by the full Hamiltonian , but once it's over, all of the new elementary particles and new bound states separate again and one finds a new noninteracting state called the out state. The S-matrix is more symmetric under relativity than the Hamiltonian, because it does not require a choice of time slices to define.

This paradigm allows one to calculate the probabilities of all of the processes that we have observed in 70 years of particle collider experiments with remarkable accuracy.  But many interesting physical phenomena do not obviously fit into this paradigm. For example, if one wishes to consider the dynamics inside of a neutron star sometimes one wants to know more than what it will finally decay into.  In other words, one may be interested in measurements that are not in the asymptotic future.  Sometimes an asymptotic past or future is not even available.  For example, it is very possible that there is no past before the Big Bang.

In the 1960s, the S-matrix paradigm was elevated by many physicists to a fundamental law of nature. In S-matrix theory, it was stated that any quantity that one could measure should be found in the S-matrix for some process. This idea was inspired by the physical interpretation that S-matrix techniques could give to Feynman diagrams restricted to the mass-shell, and led to the construction of dual resonance models. But it was very controversial, because it denied the validity of quantum field theory based on local fields and Hamiltonians.

The connection to Lippmann–Schwinger

Intuitively, the slightly deformed eigenfunctions  of the full Hamiltonian H are the in and out states.  The  are noninteracting states that resemble the in and out states in the infinite past and infinite future.

Creating wavepackets

This intuitive picture is not quite right, because   is an eigenfunction of the Hamiltonian and so at different times only differs by a phase. Thus, in particular, the physical state does not evolve and so it cannot become noninteracting.  This problem is easily circumvented by assembling  and  into wavepackets with some distribution  of energies  over a characteristic scale .  The uncertainty principle now allows the interactions of the asymptotic states to occur over a timescale  and in particular it is no longer inconceivable that the interactions may turn off outside of this interval.  The following argument suggests that this is indeed the case.

Plugging the Lippmann–Schwinger equations into the definitions

and

A contour integral

This integral may be evaluated by defining the wave function over the complex E plane and closing the E contour using a semicircle on which the wavefunctions vanish. The integral over the closed contour may then be evaluated, using the Cauchy integral theorem, as a sum of the residues at the various poles.

In fact, for very positive times t the  factor in a Schrödinger picture state forces one to close the contour on the lower half-plane. Both of these varieties of poles occur at finite imaginary energies and so are suppressed at very large times. The remainder is equal to the  wavepacket. Thus, at very late times , identifying  as the asymptotic noninteracting out state.

One then finds that the 
and  wavepackets are equal in the asymptotic past, identifying  as the asymptotic noninteracting in state.

The complex denominator of Lippmann–Schwinger

A formula for the S-matrix

The S-matrix is defined to be the inner product

of the ath and bth Heisenberg picture asymptotic states. As a result, the contour now does pick up the energy pole. This can be related to the 's if one uses the S-matrix to swap the two 's. Identifying the coefficients of the 's on both sides of the equation one finds the desired formula relating S to the potential

In the Born approximation, corresponding to first order perturbation theory, one replaces this last  with the corresponding eigenfunction  of the free Hamiltonian H0, yielding

which expresses the S-matrix entirely in terms of V and free Hamiltonian eigenfunctions.

These formulas may in turn be used to calculate the reaction rate of the process , which is equal to

Homogenization
With the use of Green's function, the Lippmann–Schwinger equation has counterparts in homogenization theory (e.g. mechanics, conductivity, permittivity).

See also
Bethe–Salpeter equation

References

Bibliography

Original publications

Scattering